Sam Moore (born September 4, 1962) is a former American football wide receiver who played four seasons in the Arena Football League with the Dallas Texans and Las Vegas Sting. He played college football at Sam Houston State University. He was also a member of the BC Lions of the Canadian Football League.

References

External links
Just Sports Stats

Living people
1964 births
Players of American football from Dallas
Players of Canadian football from Dallas
American football wide receivers
Canadian football wide receivers
African-American players of American football
African-American players of Canadian football
Sam Houston Bearkats football players
BC Lions players
Dallas Texans (Arena) players
Las Vegas Sting players
National Football League replacement players
21st-century African-American people
20th-century African-American sportspeople